Lee Wilson (born 21 August 1993) is a Scottish footballer who plays for Hill of Beath Hawthorn.

Career
Wilson was born in Kirkcaldy, Fife, and started his career with Blue Brazil Boys Club. He joined Cowdenbeath in February 2007, at age of thirteen and spent the next three-and-a-half-years playing for the under-age sides. He made his senior debut on 23 October 2010 against Greenock Morton as a substitute following David Hay's dismissal. His first task was to face a Peter Weatherson spot kick which hit the inside of the post and ran along the goal line before being cleared by Scott Linton. The match ended in 2–2 draw with Wilson having made numerous saves including a penalty from Brian Graham. He signed a new contract in advance of 2011–12 season following the appoint of Colin Cameron as manager.

Wilson left Cowdenbeath in 2013 and had stints at several Fife clubs, including Dundonald Bluebell, Lochgelly Albert and St. Andrews United, before signing for Linlithgow Rose in 2019.

Career statistics
. 

a.  Includes other competitive competitions, including the Scottish Challenge Cup.

References

External links

1993 births
Living people
Footballers from Kirkcaldy
Association football goalkeepers
Scottish footballers
Cowdenbeath F.C. players
Linlithgow Rose F.C. players
Scottish Football League players